Palolo may refer to:
 Palolo, Hawaii, a valley and neighborhood of Honolulu, Hawaii
 Palolo worm, a species of invertebrate that lives in tropical coral reefs

See also
 Palola (genus of polychaetes)